The Commander-in-chief of the Royal Cambodian Armed Forces is the highest-ranking military officer of in the Royal Cambodian Armed Forces, who is responsible for maintaining the operational command of the military and its major branches.

List of commanders

Khmer National Armed Forces (1970–1975)

Liberation Army of Kampuchea (1977–1979)

Kampuchean People's Revolutionary Armed Forces (1979–1989)

Cambodian People's Armed Forces (1989–1993)

Royal Cambodian Armed Forces (1993–present)

References

Military of Cambodia
Cambodia